John "Bull" Karcis (December 3, 1908 – September 4, 1973) was an American football player and coach.  He played professionally as a fullback in the National Football League (NFL) for the Brooklyn Dodgers, Pittsburgh Pirates, and New York Giants.  Karcis was also the head coach for the Detroit Lions in 1942.  He played college football at Carnegie Tech.

Karcis served as coach of the Lions in 1942 after Bill Edwards was fired three games into the season. It was a season of disaster for the team, which had player shortages due to World War II that took out talent. In his eight games as coach, Karcis lost each one, with the Lions being shutout three times. The most points scored by the team during his tenure was 7, which was done four times.

Karcis was inducted into the Beaver County Sports Hall of Fame.

References

External links

1908 births
1973 deaths
American football fullbacks
Brooklyn Dodgers (NFL) players
Carnegie Mellon Tartans football players
Detroit Lions head coaches
New York Giants players
Pittsburgh Pirates (football) players
People from Monaca, Pennsylvania
Players of American football from Pennsylvania